Ronald Roger Howell (born 22 May 1949 in Tottenham, Middlesex, England), is an English footballer who played as a midfielder in the Football League.

References

External links
Ron Howell's Career

1949 births
Living people
English footballers
Footballers from Tottenham
Association football midfielders
Cambridge United F.C. players
Kettering Town F.C. players
Swindon Town F.C. players
Millwall F.C. players
Brighton & Hove Albion F.C. players
Tooting & Mitcham United F.C. players
Barnet F.C. players
English Football League players